Callitris sulcata is a species of conifer in the cypress family, Cupressaceae. Its common name is Sapin de Comboui. It is endemic to New Caledonia, where it grows only in three forested river valleys. It is an endangered species with a global population of no more than 2500 individuals.

References

sulcata
Endemic flora of New Caledonia
Trees of New Caledonia
Taxonomy articles created by Polbot